The 2000 NCAA Division III men's basketball tournament was the 26th annual single-elimination tournament to determine the national champions of National Collegiate Athletic Association (NCAA) men's Division III collegiate basketball in the United States.

The field contained sixty-four teams, and each program was allocated to one of four sectionals. All sectional games were played on campus sites, while the national semifinals, third-place final, and championship finals were contested at the Salem Civic Center in Salem, Virginia.

Calvin defeated Wisconsin–Eau Claire, 79–74, in the championship, clinching a second national title.

The Knights (31–1) were coached by Kevin Vande Streek. Calvin's prior championship came in 1992.

Sherm Carstensen of Wisconsin-Eau Claire was named Most Outstanding Player after scoring 34 points in the semifinal and 36 in the championship game.

Championship Rounds
Site: Salem Civic Center, Salem, Virginia

See also
2000 NCAA Division I men's basketball tournament
2000 NCAA Division II men's basketball tournament
2000 NCAA Division III women's basketball tournament
2000 NAIA Division I men's basketball tournament

References

NCAA Division III men's basketball tournament
NCAA Men's Division III Basketball
Ncaa Tournament